Iserosaurus is an extinct genus of sea turtle from the Late Cretaceous of Czech Republic.

Taxonomy
Iserosaurus was originally described as a new taxon of mosasauroid by Fritsch (1905) on the basis of a disarticulated skeleton from Turonian-age chalk deposits in Bohemia, Czech Republic. However, Persson (1963) tentatively listed it as a dubious plesiosaur in his overview of plesiosaur classification. Karl (2002) recognized Iserosaurus as being a protostegid turtle and assigned it to cf. Archelon. Kear et al. (2013) agreed with Karl (2002) that Iserosaurus is a marine turtle but noted differences from Archelon, so assigned the genus to Protostegidae indet.

References

Protostegidae
Prehistoric turtle genera
Fossil taxa described in 1905
Extinct turtles